The Georgian Industrial Group (GIG, Sak'art'velos Industriuli Jgup'i) is the largest holding company in Georgia, with business interests ranging from energy to real estate, headquartered in the country's capital of Tbilisi. It was founded, in 2006, by David Bezhuashvili, With more than 3000 employed staff and combined annual sales revenues of USD 160 m Georgian Industrial Group (GIG) is one of the largest industrial groups in Georgia.

The business of GIG has been expanding quite steadily over the last years by means of acquisitions but also through organic growth e.g. by construction of new generation facilities such as hydropower plants. Over the last few years we accelerated growth in areas such as energy trading and we prepared the ground to reach more than 1000 MW in installed electric power generation capacity as well as a market share in Georgian electricity generation of some 25 to 30% within the next 3 to 4 years.

GIG has a diversified business portfolio with a clear focus on the energy sector including the following:

 Electricity generation and trading: the group owns and operates thermal and hydropower plants with a total installed capacity of 662 MW.  A 300 MW coal fired power plant with modern CFB combustion technology is currently under reconstruction. The group furthermore has some 70 MW of hydro and wind energy facilities under planning and development. Overall GIG accounts for some 20% market share in electricity generation of Georgia. GIG and its subsidiaries are the largest electricity trader in Georgia handling export/import, transit and swap transactions with all of its neighboring countries.
 Coal mining: GIG owns and operates the only coal mine in Georgia. With under license reserves of more than 331 m tons Tkibuli coal mine development envisages rising output up to 1 m tons p/y by 2020.
 CNG refueling and natural gas trading: Under its brand NEOGAS owns and operates a large network of CNG refueling stations across Georgia.  Besides, GIG is involved in regional gas trade and wholesale trading in Georgia. Preparatory works are underway to explore and commercialize the abundant coal bed methane potential of our coal deposits.
 GIG are also involved in commercial real estate, construction materials, beverages and metal works.

The largest subsidiaries and affiliated companies of GIG are Georgian International Energy Corporation, Mtkvari Energy, Saknakhshiri, CPower, Tiflis Group, Globaltrans and Kutaisi Auto-Mechanical Factory.

A member of the Parliament of Georgia from the ruling United National Movement party and brother of the then-Minister of Foreign Affairs of Georgia Gela Bezhuashvili. The group has been involved in several international projects in Georgia and is a corporate member of the EU–Georgia Business Council.

Subsidiary companies
As of February 2012, the GIG encompassed a number of subsidiary companies operating in energy sector, acquiring and processing of natural resources, production of building materials, logistics service, real estate development, etc. These companies are:
The Georgian International Energy Corporation, founded in 2005 and involved in importing and distribution of natural gas. It also operates several small and medium hydroelectric power plants and plans to construct thermal power plants that will utilize coal mined in Tkibuli, western Georgia.
The Saqnakshiri GIG Group, the only enterprise in Georgia that extracts coal. It operates the Tkibuli-Shaori and Akhaltsikhe Lignite coal mines.
Intertrans, which operates a container terminal in Tbilisi. 
Globaltrans, founded in 2005 and involved in construction of highways and the Millennium Project road, building of military bases, construction of irrigation systems, etc.
The Kutaisi Auto Mechanical Plant, one of the oldest production facilities in the Caucasus region founded in 1945 as the Kutaisi Automobile Factory.  
Industria Kiri, producing quicklime.
The Durnuki Road Metal Factory, which produces road metal from raw basalt and is the major supplier to the Georgian Railway.
Orbi, founded in 2005 and involved in the production of construction blocks and walkway slabs.
Tiflis City, involved in real-estate development and management in Tbilisi and Batumi.

Tkibuli coal mine accidents

For the purpose of improving labor safety and labor conditions for the miners, the company “Saknakhshiri” has purchased new equipment of $3.5 million. New wagons, bulldozers, locomotives – part of the new equipment is already located in the company yard… Schedule allocated for the mine technical re-equipment has shifted to the final stage. Tkibuli is expecting to receive the second part of the equipment from China and Ukraine by the end of the year, after what there will begin dismantling works of old equipment and placement of new. This will virtually rebound the risk for miners, when conducting drilling and blasting works in mines, the mines will be mechanized, which is a step of utmost importance for improving labor safety and labor conditions.
Mine monitoring, the company completed re-equipment descriptive works last year. According to the schedule, renewing and rehabilitation works will commence by the end of the year. The equipment purchased and imported for the current period of time exceeds the investment of $3 million. This is a major priority for the company and they believe this is a permanent process. Seven units of local airing coolers are already on place, also four units of set of point switch locomotive adapters, three sets of locomotives. They were also renewed last year. Six sets of locomotive batteries.
In a series of accidents in 2010 and 2011, several workers were killed and injured in the Tkibuli coal mine, operated by the GIG subsidiary Saqnakhshiri. In January 2011, the President of Georgia Mikheil Saakashvili accused the coal mine owners  of neglecting safety norms and of covering up real reasons behind the incidents. The same month two of the company's employees responsible for safety issues were arrested, while the miners responded to the incidents with a strike.

Media ownership
The GIG has been heavily involved with the Georgian media, which has led to the concerns about "media concentration". In November 2009, the Transparency International–Georgia reported that the GIG was in control of 30% of the shares of the Rustavi 2 broadcasting company, 45% of Mze, an entertainment television channel, and 65% of First Stereo. Furthermore, it owned the Georgian Business Consulting, which published the English newspaper Georgian Business Week and operated the news-wire GBC.ge. After the Parliament of Georgia passed, in April 2011, amendments to the Law on Broadcasters, the GIG sold its share in the TV-company First Stereo in December 2011.

References

Holding companies of Georgia (country)
Manufacturing companies of Georgia (country)
Holding companies established in 2006
2006 establishments in Georgia (country)